Sorgho-Yargo is a village of 900 people in the Kongoussi Department of Bam Province in northern Burkina Faso.

References

External links
Satellite map at Maplandia.com

Populated places in the Centre-Nord Region
Bam Province